Joshua Jordan Dolling (born 29 December 1997) is an English professional footballer who plays as a forward for New Mexico United in the USL Championship.

Career

Youth
Dolling began playing with the Blackburn Rovers academy, before getting scouted by Manchester United's under-14 team, where he played before getting released in 2013. Dolling subsequently joined Burnley, where he played with the academy team, scoring 24 goals for the Clarets at youth level. In 2015, he joined Trafford on a short-term loan deal.

In 2016, Dolling signed with Northern Premier League Division One North side Prescot Cables, scoring six goals in ten appearances. Dolling had previously spent time on loan with Prescot Cables whilst with Burnley.

College
In 2017, Dolling moved to the United States to play college soccer at Missouri State University. In four full seasons with the Bears and a truncated 2020–21 season due to the COVID-19 pandemic, Dolling scored 40 goals and tallied 14 assists in 82 appearances. He earned All-MVC honours in all four seasons with Missouri State, MVC All-Tournament Team in 2019 and 2021, United Soccer Coaches All-American on three occasions, United Soccer Coaches All-Region on four occasions and was on the MAC Hermann Trophy Watch List in his senior year.

Following college, Dolling was available in the 2021 MLS SuperDraft, but went unselected.

Professional
In early 2022, Dolling signed with MLS Next Pro side St. Louis City SC 2 ahead of their inaugural season. His contract option was declined by St. Louis following the 2022 season.

On 23 December 2022, it was announced that Dolling would join USL Championship side New Mexico United for their 2023 season.

References

External links
Missouri State bio
MLS bio

1997 births
Association football forwards
Blackburn Rovers F.C. players
Burnley F.C. players
English expatriate footballers
English expatriate sportspeople in the United States
English footballers
Expatriate soccer players in the United States
Footballers from Liverpool
Living people
Manchester United F.C. players
MLS Next Pro players
Prescot Cables F.C. players
Trafford F.C. players
New Mexico United players